The , named  until the 2010 race, is an annual marathon race for female runners over the classic distance of 42 km and 195 metres, held in Nagoya, Japan in early March every year. It holds World Athletics Platinum road race status.

History
It began in 1980 as an annual 20-kilometre road race held in Toyohashi, Aichi, Japan. After its first two years there, the venue changed to Nagoya for the third edition in 1982. It was converted to a marathon race for the 1984 edition, and a 10-kilometre race was also added to the race programme. The race acts as the Japanese women's marathon championships on three-year rotational basis. Performances at the race are typically taken into consideration when deciding the Japanese women's Olympic or World Championship teams. Nagoya has also twice hosted the women's Asian Marathon Championship race (1988 and 1994).

The 2011 race was cancelled due to the Tōhoku earthquake that March. In 2012 the race was held on a newly designed course and was opened to public, mass participation for the first time, and renamed the Nagoya Women's Marathon. Around 15,000 runners took part that year.

The 2020 edition of the race was restricted to elite runners only due to the coronavirus pandemic.  No refunds or preferential entries to future editions were offered to general runners, but a virtual marathon was organized with commemorative items to be sent by mail to all finishers.

Winners 
Key:   

 Bolding indicates course record improvement

 NB: (*) Asterisks indicate results of 20-kilometre road races

References

Winners
Past results. Chunichi. Retrieved on 2010-01-31.
Nagoya International Women's Marathon. Association of Road Racing Statisticians (2009-03-09). Retrieved on 2010-01-31.

External links
 Official website (English page)
 Marathon Info

Nagoya
Recurring sporting events established in 1980
Marathon
1980 establishments in Japan